The Irish Music Rights Organisation (IMRO) is a national organisation that administers the performing right in copyright music in Ireland on behalf of its members (who are songwriters, composers and music publishers) and on behalf of the songwriters, composers and music publishers of the international overseas societies that are affiliated to it. At present IMRO has approximately 11,000 songwriter, composer and music publisher members.

Role in Irish Culture

In advocating and campaigning for Irish music creators, IMRO plays an essential role in the Irish music industry as well as for the exportation of Irish culture globally.

History

A public performance of copyright music takes place when that music is used anywhere outside of the domestic environment. IMRO's function is to collect and distribute royalties arising from the public performance of copyright works. It is a not-for-profit organisation. Music users such as broadcasters, venues and businesses must pay for their use of copyright music by way of a blanket licence fee. IMRO collects these monies and distributes them to the songwriters, composers and music publishers who created the songs. The monies earned by copyright owners in this way are known as public performance royalties.

In 1996, IMRO was embroiled in a national controversy over their "dogged pursuit of performance royalties in relation to primary schools." IMRO asserted that the use of copyrighted music in public schools for events like plays, concerts, or dances meant the each school should pay a licensing fee. This was seen, broadly speaking, by the public while technically correct to be wrong or immoral. Ultimately, a compromise was reached with reduced fees to be paid.

IMRO is also prominently involved in the sponsorship and promotion of music in Ireland. Every year it sponsors a large number of song contests, music festivals, seminars, workshops, research projects and showcase performances. For example, the IMRO Radio Awards have taken place every year since 2000.

As of 1 January 2016, IMRO handled the collection and distribution of royalties covered by the repertoire of PPI through a joint licensing scheme on a select range of tariffs.

References

External links
 

Music organisations based in the Republic of Ireland
Music licensing organizations